The International Poker Rules, also known as the IP Rules, provide a standardized set of tournament procedures and technical guidelines for the poker industry and its players.  The IP Rules consists of 80 technical rules, policies and procedures for tournament play.

The IP Rules reference and incorporate the latest version of the Poker Tournament Director's Association's (TDA) rules. As the official resource for the industry and its players, the IP Rules allow the poker world to train, operate and play with worldwide consistency.

The IP Rules allow card rooms and tournaments to modify the rules in accordance to a Venue's House Rules, State, Federal and Country Gaming Commission laws and regulations and/or the Tournament Director's procedures and policies.

All rules, policies, and procedures are subject to the modifications made by the Venue's management for each tournament. All modifications made to the IP Rules must be provided to the players and will take precedence in that Venue for the tournament.

History 
The International Poker Rules were created and compiled by Marcel Lüske and Michelle Lau as the Federation Internationale de Poker Association (FIDPA) to provide uniformity in poker tournaments worldwide.

FIDPA writes, interprets and maintains The International Poker Rules, in cooperation with The Poker Tournament Directors Association (TDA), Bob Ciaffone, author of “Robert's Rules of Poker,” Jack McClelland and Doug Dalton (Bellagio Hotel and Casino) and many other leading authorities, and resources from around the world. With permission from The Poker Tournament Directors Association, The International Poker Rules incorporates, references, and are compatible with the latest version of the TDA Rules.

The IP Rules were first adapted by Bellagio Hotel and Casino in July 2008.

The latest version of the International Poker Rules is from March 2018. The biggest changes made are the introduction of the button ante and the shot clock.  This version is free available at the website of the [international poker rules].

References

External links
International Poker Rules website

Poker gameplay and terminology